Declan Prendergast (born 4 October 1981) is an Irish hurler who played as a left wing-back at senior level for the Waterford county team.

Prendergast joined the team during the 2001 National League and was a regular member of the starting fifteen until his retirement prior to the 2012 championship. During that time he won three Munster medals and one National Hurling League medal. Prendergast ended up as an All-Ireland runner-up on one occasion.

At club level Prendergast is a dual player with Ardmore.

His brother, Séamus Prendergast, also played inter-county hurling with Waterford.

Playing career

Club
Prendergast plays his club hurling and Gaelic football with Ardmore.

In 2002 he won a county intermediate hurling championship medal following a 2-5 to 0-10 defeat of Clonea.

Inter-county
Prendergast made his senior debut for Waterford in a National League game against Tipperary in 2001; however, he remained on the periphery for another two seasons.

By 2004 Prendergast was a regular member of the starting fifteen. That year Waterford qualified for a third successive Munster final with Cork providing the opposition once again. Described as the game that had everything Waterford beat Cork by 3-16 to 1-21 to win one of the greatest games of hurling ever played. It was Prendergast's first Munster medal. The subsequent All-Ireland semi-final saw Waterford take on a wounded Kilkenny team.  In spite of this 'the Cats' were the winners by 3-12 to 0-18.

Three years later Prendergast added a National Hurling League medal to his collection when Waterford defeated Kilkenny by 0-20 to 0-18 in the final. He later claimed a second Munster medal as Waterford defeated Limerick by 3-17 to 1-14 in the provincial decider. While Waterford were viewed as possibly going on and winning the All-Ireland title for the first time in almost half a century, Limerick ambushed Prendergast's side in the All-Ireland semi-final.

2008 began poorly for Waterford as the team lost their opening game to Clare as well as their manager Justin McCarthy. In spite of this poor start Prendergast's side reached the All-Ireland final for the first time in forty-five years. Kilkenny provided the opposition and went on to trounce Waterford by 3-30 to 1-13 to claim a third All-Ireland title in-a-row.

Prendergast lined out in another Munster final in 2010 with Cork providing the opposition. A 2-15 apiece draw was the result on that occasion, however, Waterford went on to win the replay after an extra-time goal by Dan Shanahan. It was a third Munster winners' medal for Prendergast.

In April 2012 Prendergast announced his retirement from inter-county hurling saying "I just feel I have enough done at this stage, I'm involved for 12 years and feel that that's probably enough."

In spite of his hurling retirement, Prendergast joined the Waterford junior football team later in 2012.

Inter-provincial
Prendergast also lined out with Munster in the inter-provincial series of games.

References

1981 births
Living people
Ardmore hurlers
Ardmore Gaelic footballers
Dual players
Hurling backs
Munster inter-provincial hurlers
Waterford inter-county hurlers
Waterford inter-county Gaelic footballers